Daniel J. Kerschen (born August 2, 1952) is a Republican member of the Kansas State Senate, representing the 26th district since 2013. Kerschen previously served in the Kansas House of Representatives from 2009 to 2013.

He has a B.S. from Kansas State University.

Major donors
The top 5 donors to Kerschen's 2008 campaign:
1. Kerschen, Dan 	$2,426 	
2. Kansas Chamber of Commerce & Industry 	$500 	
3. Koch Industries 	$500 	
4. Sunflower Dairy PAC $500 	
5. Heart PAC 	$500

References

External links
 Kansas Legislature - Dan Kerschen
 Project Vote Smart profile
 Campaign contributions: 2008

Republican Party Kansas state senators
Republican Party members of the Kansas House of Representatives
Living people
1952 births
21st-century American politicians
Kansas State University alumni